Stevan Jakuš (24 December 1921 – 21 March 1985) was a Yugoslav footballer.

Club career
Born in the outskirts of Novi Sad, Jakuš started playing in NTK Novi Sad. When Second World War started and the region was occupied by Hungary, he was added to the Újvidékí AC. However, he made only one appearance for UAC in the 1941–42 Nemzeti Bajnokság I before leaving the club and joining the resistance. By the end of the war he was a member of the Yugoslav Partisans. It is recorded that in Austria in May 1945 when Yugoslav and British troops met, a football match was disputed between the two and Jakuš played on Yugoslav side.

After the war, Jakuš joins FK Partizan. Although he mostly played for the reserves team, he did made 6 appearances and scored once in the Yugoslav First League and was part of Partizan squads that were Yugoslav champions in 1946–47 and 1948–49. In Autumn 1949 he moved to BSK, later renamed OFK Beograd, and, later, in 1951, on insistence on his former teammate from Partizan, Minda Jovanović, he joined FK Mačva Šabac.

References

1921 births
1985 deaths
Footballers from Novi Sad
Hungarians in Vojvodina
Yugoslav footballers
Serbian footballers
Hungarian footballers
Association football midfielders
RFK Novi Sad 1921 players
NAK Novi Sad players
Nemzeti Bajnokság I players
FK Partizan players
OFK Beograd players
FK Mačva Šabac players
Yugoslav First League players